Carsten Herrmann-Pillath (born 24 February 1959 in Dessau, Bezirk Halle) is a German economist, sinologist, and philosopher of economics. He is the professor of Economics and Permanent Fellow at the Max Weber Centre for Advanced Cultural and Social Studies, Erfurt University, Germany.

Contents

Career
After education in economics and classical Chinese studies he received a PhD in economics at the University of Cologne, Germany (1978–1988). Between 1988 and 1992 he was researcher, China desk, at the Federal Institute of East European and International Studies, Cologne. In 1992 he was appointed professor in Chinese economic studies at the Gerhard Mercator University of Duisburg, Germany. Between 1996 and 2008 he was chair of Evolutionary and Institutional Economics and director of the Institute of Comparative Research into Culture and Economy at the Private University of Witten/Herdecke, Germany, where he also founded the Sino-German School of Governance (2005–2010). In 2008, he moved to Frankfurt School of Finance and Management and established the East West Centre for Business Studies and Cultural Science, combined with a Master Program in International Business, as a successor organization of the school. Between 2015 and 2016, he resumed a position as Professor of Economics and Evolutionary Sciences at Witten/Herdecke University. In May 2016, he was appointed Permanent Fellow at the Max Weber Centre. He is distinguished visiting professor of Schwarzman Scholars at Tsinghua University, Beijing.
Herrmann-Pillath is a leading representative of evolutionary economics and Chinese studies in Germany. His research aims at developing a cross-disciplinary theory of the economy which takes account of institutional and cultural embeddedness. Building on modern philosophical resources (ontology, philosophy of language), he approaches economics as a bridging science between the natural sciences and the humanities.

Research
Carsten Herrmann-Pillath contributed widely to the cross-disciplinary foundations of economics, with applications in empirical research and policy design, especially in research on the Chinese economy and international trade policy. His essential philosophical resources are Hegel and Peirce. In the field of evolutionary and ecological economics, he proposes a theory of economic growth that takes the concepts of energy and information as fundamental building blocks. This theory has been expanded to a theory of the technospere as emergent level of Earth system evolution. He proposes a naturalistic theory of institutions, taking money as a central application, which combines modern neuroeconomics and behavioural economics with Masahiko Aoki's theory of institutions. His synthesis is grounded on a semiotic and evolutionary reformulation of neuroeconomics. His institutional theory focuses on the notion of ‘performativity’ and ties up with recent developments in sociology and philosophy (actor-network theory, science and technology studies). In the field of international economics, he proposes the new paradigm of ‘deliberative trade policy’, with applications on the WTO. His long-time research on China has been condensed in a cultural theory of the Chinese economy, that centres on the concept of ‘ritual’. Currently, he works on a ‘critical theory of the economy’.
His long-time research on China has been condensed in a cultural theory of the Chinese economy, that centres on the concept of ‘ritual’.  In his recent work (together with Stephan Bannas) he has suggested the radical transformation of the modern capitalist economy, with key features such as geocentrism, definancialization, the abolition of all forms of limiting personal liability, and a new model of Universal Basic Income.

Important works

Books (selection)
 Foundations of Economic Evolution. A Treatise on the Natural Philosophy of Economics. Edward Elgar, Cheltenham 2013, 
 with Ivan Boldyrev, Hegel, Institutions and Economics: Performing the Social, Routledge, Abingdon and New York 2014, 
 China's Economic Culture: The Ritual Order of State and Markets, Routledge, Abingdon and New York 2016, 
 Herrmann-Pillath, Carsten, Guo Man and Feng Xingyuan (2020): Ritual and Economy in Metropolitan China: A Global Social Science Approach, Routledge.

Academic articles (selection)
 "Evolutionary mechanisms of choice: Hayekian perspectives on neurophilosophical foun-dations of neuroeconomics". Economics and Philosophy, 1–20. 2021. 
 with Guo Man, "Interaction ritual chains and religious economy: Explorations on ritual in Shenzhen". Identities, 2021. 
 "Power, ideas and culture in the ‘longue durée’ of institutional evolution: Theory and ap-plication on the revolutions of property rights". Russia, Journal of Evolutionary Economics, 29(5), 1483–1506, 2019. 
 "From dual systems to dual function: Rethinking methodological foundations of behavioural economics". Economics & Philosophy, 35(3), 403–422. 2019. 
 "The Case for a New Discipline: Technosphere Science". Ecological Economics, 149, 212–225, 2018, 
 "Constitutive explanations in neuroeconomics: Principles and a case study on money". Journal of Economic Methodology. 23 (4): 374–395. 2016. 
 "Fei Xiaotong's comparative theory of Chinese culture: Its relevance for contemporary cross-disciplinary research on Chinese ‘collectivism’". Copenhagen Journal of Asian Studies 34(1), 2016, 25–57, http://rauli.cbs.dk/index.php/cjas/article/view/5187

References

External links
 MWK Erfurt:[erfurt.de/max-weber-kolleg/personen/herrmann-pillath/]
 Personal website: 
 Blog: 
 Social Science Research Network: 
 Research Gate: 
 Neuroscience: 

1959 births
Living people
People from Dessau-Roßlau
People from Bezirk Halle
German economists